The Bobbin is a pub at 1–3 Lillieshall Road, Clapham, London SW4.

It is a Grade II listed building, originally The Tim Bobbin, dating back to the late 19th century.

References

External links
 
 

Grade II listed pubs in London
Grade II listed buildings in the London Borough of Lambeth
Pubs in the London Borough of Lambeth